Vasily Pavlovich Butusov (Russian: Василий Павлович Бутусов; 26 January 1892 (OS)/7 February 1892 (NS) – 28 September 1971) was a Russian Empire amateur association football player who competed in the 1912 Summer Olympics.

He was a member of the Russian Olympic squad and played one match in the main tournament as well as one match in the consolation tournament. He scored the only goal for Russia in this competition. The fact that this was also the first ever international game for Russia meant that he became the first goal scorer for Russia.

Butusov was born and died in Saint Petersburg. He was the brother of Mikhail Butusov.

References

External links
profile 

1892 births
1971 deaths
Russian footballers
Russia international footballers
Olympic footballers of Russia
Footballers at the 1912 Summer Olympics
Soviet prisoners of war
Footballers from Saint Petersburg
Association football forwards